The 10th Cruiser Squadron, also known as Cruiser Force B was a formation of cruisers of the British Royal Navy from 1913 to 1917 and then again from 1940 to 1946.

First formation 

The squadron was established in July 1913 and allocated to the Third Fleet. In July 1914 it was reassigned to the new Grand Fleet, the squadron was also made Cruiser Force B in August 1914 but was more famously known as the Northern Patrol. It remained with the Grand Fleet until December 1917.

The squadron was disbanded from January 1918 to 1937

Second formation 
On 22 March 1937 the Admiralty announced the temporary formation of the squadron for the coronation fleet review by King George VI on 20 April 1937. The squadron was commanded by Rear-Admiral Arthur Dowding.

Third formation 
The squadron reformed in September 1940 and attached to the Home Fleet for the duration of the Second World War until September 1945. On 22 December 1943 the squadron was involved in the Battle of the North Cape where it was called Force 2. On 27 December 1943, it was engaged at the Battle of the Barents Sea as Force R. In October 1946 the squadron was renamed the 2nd Cruiser Squadron and assigned to the Mediterranean Fleet.

Notes

References 
  Watson, Graham.  (2015) "Royal Navy Organization and Ship Deployments 1900–1914". www.naval-history.net. Graham Smith.
  Watson, Graham. (2015) "Royal Navy Organization in World War 2, 1939–1945: Overseas Commands and Fleets". www.naval-history.net. Gordon Smith.

Cruiser squadrons of the Royal Navy
Ship squadrons of the Royal Navy in World War I
Military units and formations disestablished in 1946